Gaga (stylized in all uppercase) is a 2022 Taiwanese drama-comedy film co-written and directed by Laha Mebow. The film revolves around a granddaughter whose return from abroad brings about a chain of events that will change the family; with one family member entering the local village chief election, and the matriarch dreaming of the family's possible new life. The film was released in theaters on November 11, 2022.

Cast
 Wilang Noming as Grandpa Ha-yong
 Kagaw Piling as Grandma Ya-meng
 Lin Ting-li
 Esther Huang 
 Wilang Lalin
 Yukan Losing as Yi-nuo
 Buya Watan
 Gaki Baunay 
 Andy Huang 
 Brando Huang

Awards and nominations

References

External links
 
 

2022 films
2022 comedy-drama films
Taiwanese comedy-drama films
2020s Mandarin-language films
Atayal-language films
Indigenous films